Salawati is one of the four major islands in the Raja Ampat Islands in Southwest Papua (formerly West Papua), Indonesia. Its area is 1,623 km2. Salawati is separated from New Guinea to the southeast by the Sele Strait (a.k.a. Galowa Strait, Revenges Strait), and from Batanta to the north by the Pitt Strait (a.k.a. Sagewin Strait).

History 
Islam first arrived in the Raja Ampat archipelago in the 15th century due to political and economic contacts with the Bacan Sultanate. During the 16th and 17th centuries, the Sultanate of Tidore had close economic ties with the island. The name of the island comes from Shalawat which was spoken by the Sultan of Bacan as he arrived on the island and memorialized as 'Salawati'. During this period, Islam became firmly established and local chiefs had begun adopting Islam. On this island also once stood an Islamic kingdom named Salawati Kingdom which was founded by Fun Malaban. The southern part of the island is the region of Sailolof Kingdom based in Sailolof, which was founded by Fun Mo, a Moi not related to the other kings but later married Pinfun Libit, daughter of Waigeo's king.

Administration
Salawati Island (with small offshore islets) comprises five administrative districts (kecamatan) of Southwest Papua Province. The northern part of the island is divided into North Salawati (Salawati Utara), West Salawati (Salawati Barat) and Central Salawati (Salawati Tengah) districts of Raja Ampat Regency, while the southern part is divided into South Salawati (Salawati Selatan) and Central Salawati (Salawati Tengah) districts of Sorong Regency. Note that the name of Central Salawati District is held by two different districts in adjacent parts of the two regencies.

Pulau Salawati Utara Nature Reserve

Pulau Salawati Utara Nature Reserve covers much of the northern portion of the island, with an area of 570 km2 on the northern portion of the island. It protects part of the island's native lowland rain forest.

References 

Raja Ampat Islands